Michael Jackson's Moonwalker is the name of several video games based on the 1988 Michael Jackson film Moonwalker. Sega developed two beat 'em ups, released in 1990; one released in arcades and another released for the Sega Genesis and Master System consoles. U.S. Gold also published various games for home computers the same year. Each of the games' plots loosely follows the "Smooth Criminal" segment of the film, in which Jackson rescues kidnapped children from the evil Mr. Big, and incorporates synthesized versions of some of the musician's songs. Following Moonwalker, Jackson collaborated with Sega on several other video games.

Sega arcade version 

 is an arcade video game by Sega (programming) and Triumph International (audiovisuals), with the help of Jackson which was released on the Sega System 18 hardware. The arcade has distinctively different gameplay from its computer and console counterparts, focusing more on beat 'em up gameplay elements rather than platform gameplay.

Gameplay 
The game is essentially a beat-em-up that is drawn using isometric video game graphics, although Jackson attacks with magic powers instead of physical contact, and has the ability to shoot short-ranged magic power at enemies.  The magic power can be charged by holding the attack button to increase the range and damage of the magic power.  If up close to enemies, Jackson executes a spinning melee attack using magic power.

If the cabinet supports it, up to three people can play simultaneously. All three players play as Jackson, dressed in his suit (white for player 1, red for player 2, black for player 3).

Jackson's special attack is termed "Dance Magic".  There are three different dance routines that may be performed, and the player starts with one to three of these attacks per credit (depending on how the machine is set up).

Bubbles, Michael's real-life pet chimpanzee, appears in each level. Once collected or rescued, Bubbles transforms Michael into a robotic version, with the ability to shoot laser bursts and missiles and absorb significantly more damage.

Development 
In 1988, Michael Jackson contacted Sega about developing a video game that would capture his persona. Sega and Jackson then began working on an arcade video game based on his Moonwalker film and "Smooth Criminal" music video released that year. A prototype unit was demonstrated at Mexico's American Amusement Machine Association (AAMA) exhibition in early July 1990. Jackson assisted Sega's game designers on the development of the game.

Reception 
In North America, the game had a successful launch. It was the top-grossing new video game on the RePlay arcade charts in September 1990.

The game received a positive review from RePlay magazine.

Sega console versions 

Home versions of the game were released for Sega's Mega Drive/Genesis and Master System home video game systems though the gameplay was completely different from the arcade version. A version was also rated by PEGI for release on Virtual Console, but it never materialized, and it was never specified which version was considered for rerelease. The home console versions were actually based on an evolved version of the home computer version of the game (with gameplay somewhat similar to the Shinobi series), in contrast to the arcade version which was a three-quarters view shooter/fighter type game. The game involves the player controlling the pop star in a quest to save all the kids that have been kidnapped by Mr. Big.

The game's levels and music were borrowed from the film (though many of the music tracks were taken from Jackson's Thriller album as well) and the player has the ability to destroy enemies by making them dance. Jackson can become a robot by rescuing a certain child and then grabbing a comet that falls from the sky.

Gameplay 
The gameplay is focused on finding children, all of whom resemble Katie from the movie, who are scattered throughout the levels, some behind objects such as doors. Most of the objects are empty or contain enemies. Jackson's standard attack is a stylized high kick that is commonly incorporated into his dance routines; in the Sega Genesis version, Jackson's attacks fire off blue sparks, giving him greater offensive range. If the player continues to hold the attack button, and moves Jackson backwards, he performs his Moonwalk dance move. Jackson also has a special attack button which, when held, will cause him to start spinning; releasing it will cause him to throw his hat at enemies, destroying them instantly, but if the button is held for longer, Jackson will bring all on-screen enemies together to start dancing to his music. Once the choreography is finished, all enemies are damaged or defeated. These special attacks cost Jackson some health, sapping up to half his full life bar at full charge. Rescuing children restores some of Jackson's health. Once all children are rescued, Bubbles will mount on Michael's shoulders and point him in the direction of the level's final confrontation, where Mr. Big taunts him before sending waves of enemies for Jackson to defeat (on the Master System version, Bubbles is absent, and the levels cut straight from the final child to the enemy rush).

Prototype 

A prototype of the Sega Genesis version dated April 24, 1990 surfaced that contains various differences from the final version. Most notably a full Thriller music track is present in the graveyard stage as well as a different final boss battle which is incomplete. Other differences include but are not limited to: changes in level layouts, different cutscenes, as well as minor differences in sound samples and other musical tracks. The prototype was acquired by Landon White who dumped and preserved the ROM file online on August 6, 2018.

Home computer versions 

Versions of the game were released for the popular 8-bit and 16-bit home computers of the time. They were developed by two small software houses, Irish Emerald Software Ltd and American Keypunch Software, and published by U.K. company U.S. Gold.

Gameplay 

The game features four different levels. The first level is a top-down maze-style level. The next level has similar gameplay, riding the motorcycle collecting tokens.

The third level is a side-scrolling level based on the "Smooth Criminal" clip. The player collects ammunition and shoots at gangsters in openings above the player character.

The last level involves morphing into a robot and shooting at soldiers in openings, with the player controlling a crosshair.

Reception 

MegaTech said that the Mega Drive version was an addictive platform game that had "excellent graphics". Mega magazine placed the game at number 91 in their list of the best Mega Drive games of all time, saying it was average. In 2004, the Genesis version of Moonwalker was inducted into GameSpot's list of the greatest games of all time.

Your Sinclair compared the ZX Spectrum version of the game to Gauntlet and Operation Wolf, saying it was well animated and "a surprising amount of fun".

Legacy 
Jackson later would go on to have a cameo role in Sega's Space Channel 5 and Space Channel 5: Part 2 music/rhythm games for the Dreamcast and PlayStation 2. Jackson's cameo did not return in the VR version of the first game. Jackson also appeared as a secret character in Ready 2 Rumble Boxing: Round 2. The Genesis version of the game is the subject of episode # 63 of "Angry Video Game Nerd."

See also 
 Michael Jackson games

Notes

References 

 Detailed overview of arcade version

External links 

  (console versions)
  (computer versions)
 ScrewAttack's Video Retrospective of the Arcade & Mega Drive Versions
 HonestGamers Arcade Review
 

1990 video games
Amiga games
Amstrad CPC games
Arcade video games
Atari ST games
Band-centric video games
Beat 'em ups
Commodore 64 games
Cooperative video games
DOS games
Master System games
Michael Jackson-related games
MSX games
Video games based on musicians
Run and gun games
Sega arcade games
Sega beat 'em ups
Sega video games
Sega Genesis games
Side-scrolling video games
U.S. Gold games
Video games about children
Video games based on films
Video games based on real people
ZX Spectrum games
Video games developed in Japan
Video games developed in the United Kingdom